Kohlberg & Company is an American private equity firm that focuses on leveraged buyout transactions. Founded by investor Jerome Kohlberg, Jr., the firm invests in a variety of transactions including leveraged carveout, take-private transactions, and acquisitions of privately held companies.

History

The firm was founded in 1987, when American businessman and investor Jerome Kohlberg Jr. resigned from Kohlberg Kravis Roberts & Co. over differences in strategy. Kohlberg did not favor the larger buyouts, including Beatrice Companies in 1985 and Safeway in 1986, highly leveraged transactions or hostile takeovers being pursued increasingly by KKR. Instead, Kohlberg chose to return to his roots, acquiring smaller, middle-market companies, and in 1987 he formed Kohlberg & Company along with his son James, who at that time was a KKR executive. Their intent was to concentrate on transactions that could generate returns through revenue growth and operating improvements using only moderate leverage. Jerome Kohlberg retired from Kohlberg & Company in 1994. 

Kohlberg & Company is headquartered in Mount Kisco, New York.

Funds 

As of 2023, Kohlberg & Company has raised nine private equity funds since its inception, with approximately $11 billion of investor commitments.

See also
 History of private equity and venture capital
 MarketCast

References

External links
 

Private equity firms of the United States
Companies based in Westchester County, New York
Kohlberg Kravis Roberts
Financial services companies established in 1987
Companies listed on the Nasdaq